Rossoblù (red-blues) may refer to several Italian football sides:

Bologna F.C. 1909
Cagliari Calcio
Cosenza Calcio
F.C. Crotone
Cuoiopelli Cappiano Romaiano
Genoa C.F.C.
A.S. Gubbio 1910
L'Aquila Calcio
A.C. Lumezzane
Modica Calcio
Montevarchi Calcio Aquila 1902
A.C. Montichiari
A.S.C. Potenza
F.C. Rieti
Sambenedettese Calcio
Sassari Torres 1903
Taranto Sport
Valenzana Calcio